Ramon Martinez may refer to:

Other people
Ramón Martínez (governor), Venezuelan politician
Ramón Martínez Vigil (1840–1904), Spanish priest, bishop of Oviedo

Sportspeople

Association football
Ramón Martínez (footballer, born 1981), Salvadoran football defender
Ramón Martínez (footballer, born 1996), Paraguayan football midfielder

Baseball
Ramón Martínez (third baseman) (1903–?), Cuban baseball third baseman
Ramón Martínez (pitcher) (born 1968), Dominican baseball pitcher
Ramón Martínez (infielder) (born 1972), retired Major League Baseball utility infielder

Fencing
Ramón Martínez (fencer) (born 1926), Spanish Olympic fencer
Ramon Martinez (fencing instructor), American fencing instructor

See also
Ray Martinez (disambiguation)